Tjitji: The Himba Girl, is a 2015 Namibian documentary short film directed by Oshosheni Hiveluah and produced by Virginia Witts. The film focuses on the life of Tjijandjeua 'Tjitji', a young, successful and ambitious Himba student who has secret dreams of being the next famous ‘Talk Show Host’. The film has been recognized for breaking stereotypes against women.

The film received positive reviews and won several awards at international film festivals. The film had the nominations in the categories Best Director, Best Original Screenplay, Best Original Music Score, Best Cinematography, and Best Narrative Film at the 2014 Namibian Theater and Film Awards held at the National Theatre of Namibia (NTN). Later, it won awards for cinematography and narrative film at the Namibian Theatre and Film awards in 2014.  It received special mention at the Bangalore Short Film Festival in Bangalore, India, in 2015.  Tjitji the Himba Girl was also the official short film at Africa International Film Festival in 2015.

Plot

Cast
 Uno Kamoruao as Tjitji
 Maoongo Hembinda as Tjitji’s Father  
 Tuakara Mutambo as Tjitji’s Mother  
 Naimbona Licius as Tamuna (Tamu)  
 Ester Kakoi as Verihiva  
 Ngunotje Raphael as Lesedi  
 Kauna Willem as Bolingo 
 Kehitire Daniel as Muasahepi  
 Utakara Ndando as Muasahepi’s Father

References

External links
 Official trailer

2015 films
Namibian documentary films
2015 short documentary films
Namibian short films